Venkateswara, also known by various other names, is a form of the Hindu god Vishnu. Venkateswara is the presiding deity of the Tirumala Venkateswara Temple, located in Tirupati, Sri Balaji District, Andhra Pradesh, India.

Etymology
Venkateswara literally means, "Lord of Venkata". The word is a combination of the words Venkata (the name of a hill in Andhra Pradesh) and isvara ("Lord"). According to the Brahmanda and Bhavishyottara Puranas, the word "Venkata" means "destroyer of sins", deriving from the Sanskrit words vem (sins) and kata (power of immunity).

It is also said that 'Venkata' is a combination of two words: 'ven' (keeps away) and kata' (troubles). Venkata means he 'who keeps away troubles' or 'who takes away problems' or such terms in a similar context.

Legend

Every year, hundreds of thousands of devotees donate a large amount of wealth at the Tirumala Venkateswara Temple at Tirupati, Andhra Pradesh. A legend provides the reason for the same.

Once, the sages wanted to decide the deity to dedicate a ritual. The sages appointed the sage Bhrigu to select the god. Bhrigu decided to test the gods. He first went to the King of Svarga, Indra, who ignored the sage, and was busy in enjoying the dance of apsaras in heaven. Bhrigu cursed Indra that he would only be referred to as an egoistic soul, all over the universe. He next visited Brahma. Brahma was busy with his four heads in chanting the Vedas, performing meditation, creating the world, and spending his time with his wife, Saraswati. Next, he visited Shiva. Shiva was busy in his Rudradhyanam with his wife, Parvati, at his feet. Bhrigu cursed Shiva that he would be worshipped only in the formless Lingam. At last, Bhrigu went to Vishnu. Vishnu was sleeping on Adishesha, and Lakshmi was at his feet. When Bhrigu arrived, he first saw Vishnu's feet, and felt humiliated. Enraged, he kicked Vishnu on his chest. Awakened, Vishnu started massaging Bhrigu's feet, and served him with great hospitality. Bhrigu was pleased, and ordered the sages to perform the rites to Vishnu. Lakshmi quarelled with Vishnu, as she felt that Bhrigu insulted her indirectly by hitting Vishnu on his chest where she lived, and thus left Vaikuntha. 

She settled on earth in disguise as a young-sage like boy in the ancient city of Karvir, and meditated the name of Vishnu (Regarded by adherents to be the site of the Mahalakshmi temple). Vishnu soon arrived on earth, searching for his consort. He failed to find her, and instead settled on the Seshachalam hills. This happened to be the spot in Tirupati where Varaha had rested and taught Karma Yoga to the people till the beginning of Kali Yuga, after having rescuing Bhudevi from the wicked Hiranyaksha. Vishnu sat inside an anthill in his disguise, which was situated under a tamarind tree, and started chanting the name of his wife, Mahalakshmi.

The whole earth became gloomy. On the request of Parvati and Saraswati, Shiva and Brahma incarnated as a cow and a calf respectively, in the Chola kingdom. This cow and calf were being grazed daily by a shepherd of Chola kingdom in the Seshachalam hills. Everyday, the cow used to pour her milk into the anthill to lessen the thirst of Vishnu. Due to this, the cow and calf became pale and unhealthy. The shepherd noticed this, and felt that something was awry. The next day, the shepherd took the animals for grazing, and as was the custom, the cow poured milk into the anthill. The shepherd saw this act, and he threw an axe (parasu) on the cow and calf. Vishnu noticed, and in order to protect them, Vishnu arose from the anthill and the axe hit his own forehead (the blood poured as his namam on his head). An enraged Vishnu cursed the shepherd that he would die immediately, and the latter succumbed to the blow of his own axe. This news reached the Chola king. The ruler suspected the absence of the shepherd. He went near the grazing field, and was surprised to see the corpse of the shepherd. He went to the grazing field, where the cows were offering their milk to Vishnu. However, Vishnu was in disguise, and so the king could not identify him. The king strung his arrow, believing that the milk should serve the kingdom rather than the boy he saw. Vishnu, once again, emerged, and grew enormous, stopped the arrows from passing further and he cursed the king for not maintaining the dharma of his kingdom. The king repented and surrendered at the deity's feet. Unlike the shepherd, the king had realised his mistake, which pleased Vishnu, and hence presented him with the boon that he would marry the king's daughter in his next birth. 

In his next birth, Vishnu incarnated as Srinivasa, to a woman named Vakuladevi. It is said that in the Dvapara Yuga, Krishna presented Yashoda with a boon that he would be born to the former in the Kali Yuga. Vakuladevi is regarded as the reincarnation of Yashoda. Meanwhile, the goddess Lakshmi was born at the palace of Akasha Raja, the next birth of the Chola king. Srinivasa was a forest-dweller. One day, he met a beautiful girl named Padmavati, the princess of the Chola dynasty. Padmavati fell in love with Srinivasa , and decided to get married to him. According to the boon of Vishnu to the Chola king in their previous births, Srinivasa has to get married to Padmavati, princess of Chola dynasty. For the marriage expenses, Srinivasa borrowed riches from Kubera, and promised to repay the loan with interest at the end of the Kali Yuga.

 Literature 

 Skanda Purana 
The Skanda Purana extols the significance of worshipping this deity:

Deity

Venkateswara, an avatar of Vishnu, is the presiding deity of the Tirupati temple. It is believed that the deity is Swayambhu (self manifested). The deity possesses the power of the Trimurti: Brahma, Vishnu, and Shiva, and some sects believe that Venkateswara holds the power of Shakthi and Skanda as well. Sage Annamacharya praised Venkateswara as the 'Supreme Lord' who appears as Dattatreya for yogis, Shiva for Shaivas, and appears as whichever form the devotee desires.

In the 12th century, Ramanujacharya visited Tirupati for settling a dispute that arose between the Saivites and Vaishnavites, regarding the nature of the deity set up in the Tirumala temple. Ramanuja streamlined the rituals at Tirumala temple according to Vaikanasa Agama tradition, and introduced the recitation of the Naalayira Divya Prabandham. He also set up the Tirupati Jeeyar Matha in 1119 AD, in consultation with Tirumalai Ananthalwan to institutionalise service to the deity and supervise the temple rituals. The Jeeyars, to this day, ensures that the rituals ordained by Ramanuja are observed. The deity is believed to be as old as the "Shila thoranam" in Tirumala. Tirumala has tremendous fame from the ancient period. The deity is referred to as 'Balaji' by north Indians. The scriptures state that Venkateswara is the saviour of all suffering people in the Kali Yuga. Emperors like Krishnadevaraya and many devotees have paid homage to Venkateswara. 

Five Deities
According to the Vaikhanasa Agamas, Venkateswara is represented by five deities (berams) including the Moolavirat, which are together referred to as the Pancha beramulu in Telugu (pancha means five; beram means deity). The five deities are Dhruva Beram (Moolavar), Kautuka Beram, Snapana Beram, Utsava Beram, and Bali Beram. All the pancha berams are placed in the Garbha griha under Ananda Nilayam Vimanam.

Moolavirat (Chief deity) or Dhruva Beram- In the centre of the Garbha griha, under the Ananda Nilayam Vimana, the Moolavirat of Venkateswara is seen in a standing posture on lotus base, with four arms, two holding shanka and chakra, one in the Varada posture, and the other in the Kati posture. This deity is considered the main source of energy for the temple, and is adorned with the Vaishnavite nama and jewels, including vajra kiritam (diamond crown), Makarakundalas, Nagabharana, Makara Kanti, Saligrama haram, Lakshmi haram. Venkateswara's consort, Lakshmi, stays on the chest of the Moolavirat as Vyuha Lakshmi.
Bhoga Srinivasa or Kautuka Beram -- This is a small one-foot (0.3 m) silver deity that was given to the temple in 614 AD by the Pallava queen, Samavai, for conducting festivals. Bhoga Srinivasa is always placed near the left foot of Moolavirat, and is believed to always be connected to the main deity by the holy Sambandha Kroocha. This deity receives many daily sevas (pleasures) on behalf of Moolavar, and is hence known as Bhoga Srinivasa (Bhoga: pleasure).  This deity receives Ekanthaseva daily (the last ritual of the day), and Sahasra Kalasabhisheka (a special abhishekam (ablution) with sacred waters in 1008 kalashas (pots)) on Wednesdays.
Ugra Srinivasa or Snapana Beram - This deity represents the fearsome (Ugra: terrible) aspect of Venkateswara. This deity was the main processional deity until 1330 CE, when it was replaced by the Malayappa Swami deity. Ugra Srinivasa remains inside the sanctum sanctorum, and is carried out on a procession only one day in a year, on Kaishika Dwadasi, before the sunrise. This deity receives daily abhishekam'' on behalf of Moolavirat, offering it the name Snapana Beram (Snapana: cleansing)Malayappa Swami or Utsava Beram - Malayappa is the processional deity (Utsava beram) of the temple, and is always flanked by the idols of his consorts, Sridevi and Bhudevi. This deity receives veneration on all festivals, like Brahmotsavams, Kalyanotsavam, Dolotsavam, Vasanthotsavam, Sahasra deepalankarana seva, Padmavati parinyotsavams, pushpapallaki, Anivara asthanam, Ugadi asthanam, etc.Koluvu Srinivasa or Bali Beram''' - Koluvu Srinivasa represents the Bali Beram. Koluvu Srinivasa is regarded as the guardian deity of the temple, that presides over its financial and economic affairs. Daily Koluvu seva (Koluvu: engaged in) is held in the morning, during which the previous day's offerings, income, expenditures. are notified to this deity, with a presentation of accounts. Panchanga sravanam is also held at the same time, during which that particular day's tithi, sunrise and sunset time, and nakshatra. are notified to Venkateswara.

Hymns
The Venkateswara Suprabhatam is the first and pre-dawn prayer performed to Venkateswara at Sayana Mandapam, inside the sanctum sanctorum of the Tirumala Temple. 'Suprabhatam' is a Sanskrit term, which literally means ‘morning salutations’, and is meant to wake up the deity from his celestial sleep. The Venkateswara Suprabhatam hymns were composed by Prathivadhi Bhayankaram Annangaracharya during the 13th century, and consists of 70 slokas in four parts, including Suprabhatam (29), Stotram (11), Prapatti (14), and Mangalasasanam (16).

Tallapaka Annamacharya (Annamayya), the poet saint of 14th century, one of the greatest Telugu poets and a great devotee of Venkateswara, had sung 32000 songs in praise of Venkateswara. All his songs, which are in Telugu and Sanskrit, are referred to as Sankirtanas and are classified as Sringara Sankirtanalu and Adhyatma Sankirtanalu.

Other Venkateswara temples
India

 Venkateswara Temple, Dwaraka Tirumala, West Godavari District, Andhra Pradesh
 Sri Venkateswara Swamy Temple, Kurukshetra, Haryana
 Paduthirupathi Venkataramana Temple, Karkala, Karnataka
 Sri Venkataramana Temple, Carstreet, Mangalore, Karnataka, India
Venkatachalapathy Temple
 Shree Balaji Mandir, Fanaswadi
Shri Lakshmi Venkate Devasthan, Chatribagh, Indore, Madhya Pradesh
Shri Ramanuj Kot Mandir,291. MG Road,Indore,Madhya Pradesh
Kodandarama Temple, Buchireddypalem, Nellore District, Andhra Pradesh
Shri Balaji Temple, Washim, Maharastra
Sri Venkateswara Swamy Devastanam, Jamalapuram, Khammam Dist, Telangana
Sri Venkateswara Swamy Devastanam, Kaman Bajar, Khammam Dist, Telangana
Sri Venkateswara Swamy Devastanam, Garla, Khammam Dist, Telangana
Sri Venkateswara Swamy Devastanam, Jeelacheruvu, Khammam Dist, Telangana
Sri Venkateswara Swamy Devastanam, Palvoncha, Khammam Dist, Telangana

Indonesia
 Sri Balaji Venkateswara Temple, Medan, North Sumatera

Mauritius
Sri Prasanna Venkateswara Swami Temple, La Laura-Malenga
Hari Hara Devasthanam
United States of America

Malibu Hindu Temple, California
Venkateswara Temple, Minnesota
Sri Venkateswara Temple, Pittsburgh
Sri Venkatewara Temple of North Carolina
Sri Balaji Temple, Bridgewater, NJ
 Sri Venkateswara Temple at Castle Rock, Denver, Colorado
Sree Venkatesvara temple, Richfield Ohio (Cleveland area) 
Hindu Temple of Atlanta, Riverdale GA
Sri Venkateswara Swami (Balaji) Temple, Aurora Illinois (Chicago Area)
Sri Venkateswara Temple of Central Ohio (Columbus, Ohio)
HECSA Portland Balaji Temple (Hillsboro, Oregon)

Australia

Venkateswara Temple

England
Shri Venkateswara (Balaji) Temple, West Midlands, England

Malaysia
Sri Venkatachalapathi & Alamelu Temple, Batu Caves, Selangor

Nepal
Narayanhiti Temple (Inside Royal Palace of Narayanhiti) Kathmandu
Budhanilakantha Temple ( Sleeping Vishnu), Kathmandu

See also

Padmavathi
Vakula Devi
Perumal
Sri Venkateswara Mahatyam
Sri Tirupati Venkateswara Kalyanam

References

External links
 Veṅkaṭācala-māhātmya, Skanda Purana
Official Tirumala Homepage

Forms of Vishnu
Regional Hindu gods
Telugu names